The 2022 SBS Drama Awards, presented by Seoul Broadcasting System (SBS). It was held on December 31, 2022, from 20:35 (KST) at SBS Prism Tower in Sangam-dong, Mapo-gu, Seoul. The show was hosted by Shin Dong-yup, Kim Se-jeong, and Ahn Hyo-seop.

Kim Nam-gil won the grand prize for his performance in Through the Darkness, whereas Namkoong Min received the Director's Award for One Dollar Lawyer.

Winners and nominees

Presenters

Performances

See also 
 2022 KBS Drama Awards
 2022 MBC Drama Awards

Notes

References

External links 

Seoul Broadcasting System original programming
2022 television awards
SBS Drama Awards
2022 in South Korea
2022 in South Korean television
December 2022 events in South Korea